Reserve-Infanterie-Regiment Nr. 86 was a reserve infantry regiment in the Imperial German Army organized during the mobilization period of August 1914, and remained in service through to the end of World War I.

Organization

In accordance with the mobilization plan, the regiment began to organize in Flensburg (I. & II. Batls.) and Schleswig (III. Batl.) and was assigned to 35. Infanterie-Brigade, 18. Reserve-Division, IX. Reserve-Armee-Korps. Its organization was completed on August 9.

First World War
Once the regiment was fully organized it was deployed south of Flensburg until August 22 to serve as a border guard against Denmark.  Between August 22 and 24, the regiment was transported to Belgium, where it detrained in Esemael north of Brussels. The regiment's strength upon departure was: 83 officers, 3190 other ranks, and 240 horses.

Legacy

Commanders

 Oberstleutnant von Tippelskirch
 Oberst von Loeper
 Major von Scheffer (April 16, 1917 - c. March 19, 1918), later KIA as CO of Reserve-Infanterie-Regiment Nr. 213 [source states: Infanterie-Regiment Nr. 213]
 Major von Picardi (March 19, 1918 - ), formerly of 6. Garde-Grenadier-Regiment
 Major Claus ( - September 29, 1918), taken POW
 Major Deichmann (October 1, 1918 - )

Notable members
 Fritz Beckhardt, flying ace, who won both the First and Second Class Iron Cross while with the regiment

See also
List of Imperial German infantry regiments

References
 Klähn, Friedrich. Geschichte des Reserve-Infanterie-Regiments Nr 86 im Weltkriege. Oldenburg: Stalling, 1925.

Infantry regiments of the Prussian Army